Byers is a surname. Notable people with the surname include:

People 
 Brad Byers, American stunt performer
 Eben Byers, American socialite and victim of radiation poisoning
 Horace R. Byers (1906–1998), American meteorologist
 Howard Webster Byers (1856–1928), American politician
 John Byers (architect), Southern Californian architect and builder noted for use of the Spanish Colonial Revival style
 Kevin Byers (born 1979), Scottish footballer
 Lefty Byers (1905–2000), American professional basketball coach
 Lyndon Byers (born 1964), former professional hockey player and current radio DJ
 Margaret Byers (1832–1912), Irish educator, activist, social reformer, missionary, writer
 Neil Erland Byers (1928–2020), Canadian politician
 Nina Byers (1930–2014), theoretical physicist
 Peter Byers (born 1984), Antiguan football striker
 Peter Byers (field hockey) (born 1944), New Zealand Olympic field hockey player
 Roddy Byers, English musician; lead guitarist in The Specials
 Stephen Byers, British politician; the Labour Member of Parliament for Tyneside North and a former cabinet minister
 Tom Byers (athlete) (born 1956), former middle-distance runner
 Tom Byers (professor), professor at Stanford University
 Verne Byers (1918–2008), bandleader, bassist, concert promoter
 William Byers (1831–1903), founding figure of Omaha, Nebraska

Fictional characters 
 John Fitzgerald Byers, one of the Three Lone Gunmen in The X-Files
 Jonathan Byers, the son of Joyce Byers and older brother of Will Byers from the Netflix series Stranger Things
 Joyce Byers, the mother of Jonathan and Will Byers from the Netflix series Stranger Things
 Will Byers, the younger brother of Jonathan Byers and the son of Joyce Byers, from the Netflix series Stranger Things

See also 
 Byers (disambiguation)
 Byer (surname)

References 

English-language surnames
Surnames of Scottish origin
Americanized surnames
Toponymic surnames